This is a list of episodes for the CBS reality television show Kid Nation.

Episodes

"I'm Trying to be a Leader Here!"

"To Kill or Not to Kill"

"Deal with It!"

"Bless Us and Keep Us Safe"

"Viva La Revolución!"

"Bonanza Is Disgusting!"

"The Root of All Evil"

"Starved for Entertainment"

"Not Even Close to Fair"

"Let Me Talk!"

"I Just Like the Recess Part"

"Where's Bonanza, Dude?"

"We've All Decided to Go Mad!"

Lists of reality television series episodes